Na Na Na may refer to:

Songs

So titled
 "Na Na Na" (Dulce Niña), a song by Mexican-American cumbia group A.B. Quintanilla y Los Kumbia Kings
 "Na Na Na (Na Na Na Na Na Na Na Na Na)", a song by American rock band My Chemical Romance
 "Right Now (Na Na Na)", the lead single from Akon's third studio album, Freedom
* "Na Na Na", a 1967 single by The Shoes
 "Na Na Na", a 1974 single by Cozy Powell
 "Na Na Na", the fourth track from Tiffany's 2005 album Dust Off and Dance
 "Na Na Na", the 17th track from One Direction's 2011 album Up All Night
 "Na Na Na", the 15th track from Big Time Rush's 2013 album 24/Seven
 "Na Na Na", the first track from Pentatonix's 2015 album Pentatonix
 "Nanana", the Slovene entry to the Eurovision Song Contest 2003
"NaNaNa", the second track from Ayumi Hamasaki's 2012 album Party Queen
 "Na Na Nana Na Na", a 2009 single by Jim Jones
 Three tracks from Status Quo's 1971 album Dog of Two Head:
"Nanana (Extraction I)"
"Nanana (Extraction II)"
"Nanana"

Lyrics
 Batman Theme from the 1966 television series Batman, which features the lyrics "Na-na-na-na-na-na-na Batman"
 "Hey Jude", a song by the English rock band the Beatles featuring a coda featuring a "Na-na-na na" refrain
 "Land of a Thousand Dances", a song written and first recorded by Chris Kenner famous for its "na na na na na" hook
 "Here Comes the Hotstepper", a song by Jamaican dancehall artist Ini Kamoze which interpolates the chorus from Land of a Thousand Dances

Similar
 "Na Na Hey Hey Kiss Him Goodbye", a song written and recorded by Paul Leka, Gary DeCarlo and Dale Frashuer
 "Na Na Na Na", first single from 112's 2003 album, Hot & Wet
 "Na-NaNa-Na", a 2005 single by Nelly from his album Sweat
 "Nah Neh Nah", a song by Belgian band Vaya Con Dios

See also
 Na (disambiguation)
 Na Na (disambiguation)